"Ra-Ta Ta-Ta" is a song by Finnish singer Anna Abreu from her fifth studio album, V (2014). Abreu co-wrote the song with Jonas Karlsson and Hank Solo, who also produced the track. "Ra-Ta Ta-Ta" is a Pop song with the Dance elements that Abreu has become famous for since the Now era of 2008. The song served as the album's lead single and was made available in Finland on April 1, 2014. It marked Abreu's first release under her new recording contract with Warner Bros. Records, and her first release since returning from hiatus after promotion for her Greatest Hits compilation album ended in early 2012.

Lyrical content
'Ra-Ta Ta-Ta' is a dance-pop song that deals with the 'comeback haters' who doubted the success of Abreu's return to music following her departure from RCA Records in 2012. Abreu refers to her return to music as her 'update 2.0' and states that she and her fans 'just wanna have a good time', while the bridge refers to 'music fill[ing] the air' before going into the rapid-fire 'ra-ta ta-ta' chorus.

Chart performance
"Ra-Ta Ta-Ta" debuted and peaked at number seventeen on the Finnish Top 20 Singles Chart, becoming her first lead single to miss the top ten. However, the song matched the success of her two previous lead singles on the Download Chart and Radio Airplay Chart, where it peaked at numbers six and four, respectively.

Music video
The music video for "Ra-Ta Ta-Ta" was directed by Hannu Aukia. The video was shot in a range of locations in and around Helsinki including a disused underground car park and an empty roller-rink. In it, Abreu is seen wearing a black leotard and leather jacket, dancing with her backing dancers in a range of locations. There are also several scenes where Abreu stands singing in a darkened room while covered in silver glitter. This video attracted attention for its similarity to videos by American singer Miley Cyrus, namely "Wrecking Ball". In both videos, the two females are seen smashing objects with a sledgehammer and Abreu also performs Cyrus' signature 'twerk' during the "Ra-Ta Ta-Ta" video. The video has by far become Abreu's most-watched on YouTube, having been viewed over a million times.

Live performances
Abreu performed "Ra-Ta Ta-Ta" live at the Hartwall Arena during the break at the 2014 Kanada-malja, in front of a crowd of 13,000 people. The song was also performed at a range of music festivals across Finland during the summer of 2014, and as part of Abreu's 2014 V Tour.

Credits and personnel

Songwriting – Jonas Karlsson, Hank Solo, Anna Abreu
Production - Jonas Karlsson, Hank Solo
Engineering - Jonas Karlsson, Hank Solo (at Fried Music Studios: Helsinki, Finland)
Instruments - Jonas Karlsson, Hank Solo

Lead vocals - Anna Abreu
Backing vocals - Anna Abreu
Mixing - Arttu Peljo

Release history

References

2014 singles
2014 songs
Anna Abreu songs
Songs written by Jonas W. Karlsson